Biru ( /必录氏) was one of the Manchu clans incorporated into Bordered White Banner. The clan inhabited the territory ranging from Heilongjiang to Yehe valley. In 1689, the clan was transferred to Bordered Yellow Banner.

After the demise of the Qing dynasty, the modern-day descendants changed their surnames to Bi (毕), He (何), Yi (异). Since 1989, some modern-day descendants live in Japan.

Notable figures

Males 

 Zhumala (朱马喇,1605-1662), served as second rank military official and general of Hangzhou and held a title of third class baron and canonised as Xiangmin (襄敏)
 Keshan (科山), held a title of baron
 Funing (富宁), held a title of first class baron
 Ehui (d.1798), served as Viceroy of Sichuan in 1787, a participant of Sino-Nepalese War and war campaigns in Taiwan against Lin Shuangwen (林爽文), a participant of war campaign pacifying White Lotus in 1796, served as a Junior Protector of Crown Prince, first rank military official and Viceroy of Yun-Gui in 1797, canonised as Kejing (恪靖) and enshrined in Xianliang temple (honour revoked in 1799)
 Wenxiu (文绣), a censor
 Shanquan (善佺), an official in the Ministry of Justice (法部)

Females 
Princess Consort
 Primary consort
 Zaixun's wife, the mother of Pugong (1904–1960s), first daughter (b. 1905), second daughter (b. 1906) and third daughter (b. 1907)

References

Eight Banners
Manchu clans